Teddy Bergqvist (born 16 March 1999) is a Swedish footballer who plays as a striker for Kristianstad FC.

Club career

Malmö FF
On 14 October 2015 16-year-old Teddy Bergqvist signed a two-year apprenticeship contract with Malmö FF after spending a decade in the club's youth system. A year later, on 1 October 2016, Bergqvist made his first team debut in a 4–2 win against BK Häcken when he came on as a substitute for Jo Inge Berget in stoppage time.

On 12 July 2017, Bergqvist came on as a substitute for Paweł Cibicki in the 85th minute of Malmö FF's 1-1 first leg draw with FK Vardar in the second qualifying round of the Champions League. On 18 July, he joined Åtvidabergs FF on loan in Superettan for the rest of the 2017 season. In September, Bergqvist signed a one-year contract extension with Malmö FF to keep him at the club through the 2018 season.

On 1 February 2018, Bergqvist joined Varbergs BoIS on loan in Superettan for the 2018 season.

Kristianstad FC
On 18 January 2019, Bergqvist signed a two-year contract with Kristianstad FC. He scored his first league goal during the second match of the season, the third goal in a 2–6 defeat at Oskarshamns AIK on 13 April. During the 2019 season, Bergqvist scored 11 goals and played in all but one of the 30 league matches in Division 1 Södra. Kristianstad finished in the relegation places and after the season his contract was terminated by mutual consent.

FC Helsingør
In the winter 2020, Bergqvist went on a trial at Danish 2nd Division club FC Helsingør. He played two friendly games for the club, scoring three goals, which earned him a permanent contract which was announced and confirmed on 7 February 2020. The club confirmed on 24 November 2020, that the deal had been terminated.

Skövde AIK
Bergqvist returned to Sweden on 4 January 2021 joining Division 1 club Skövde AIK.

Kristianstad FC
On 17 July 2021, Bergqvist returned to Division 2 club Kristianstad FC.

Career statistics

Honours

Malmö FF
 Allsvenskan: 2016

References

External links
 Teddy Bergqvist at Malmö FF 
  (archive)
 
  (archive)

1999 births
Living people
Swedish footballers
Swedish expatriate footballers
Sweden youth international footballers
Footballers from Skåne County
Malmö FF players
Varbergs BoIS players
Åtvidabergs FF players
FC Helsingør players
Skövde AIK players
Allsvenskan players
Superettan players
Ettan Fotboll players
Association football forwards
Swedish expatriate sportspeople in Denmark
Expatriate men's footballers in Denmark